Westminster City Council is the local authority for the City of Westminster in Greater London, England. The city is divided into 20 wards, each electing three councillors. The council is currently composed of 31 Labour Party members and 23 Conservative Party members. The council was created by the London Government Act 1963 and replaced three local authorities: Paddington Metropolitan Borough Council, St Marylebone Metropolitan Borough Council and Westminster Borough Council.

History

There have previously been a number of local authorities responsible for the Westminster area. The current local authority was first elected in 1964, a year before formally coming into its powers and prior to the creation of the City of Westminster on 1 April 1965. Westminster City Council replaced Paddington Metropolitan Borough Council, St Marylebone Metropolitan Borough Council and the Westminster City Council which had responsibility for the earlier, smaller City of Westminster. All three had been created in 1900, with Paddington and St Marylebone replacing the parish vestries incorporated by the Metropolis Management Act 1855. Westminster itself has a more convoluted history and the metropolitan borough council established in 1900 had replaced the Vestry of the Parish of St George Hanover Square, the Vestry of the Parish of St Martin in the Fields, the Strand District Board of Works, the Westminster District Board of Works and the Vestry of the Parish of Westminster St James.

It was envisaged that through the London Government Act 1963 Westminster as a London local authority would share power with the Greater London Council. The split of powers and functions meant that the Greater London Council was responsible for "wide area" services such as fire, ambulance, flood prevention, and refuse disposal; with the local authorities responsible for "personal" services such as social care, libraries, cemeteries and refuse collection. This arrangement lasted until 1986 when Westminster City Council gained responsibility for some services that had been provided by the Greater London Council, such as waste disposal. Westminster became an education authority in 1990.

In the late 1980s, the Conservative-led Council was involved in the Homes for votes scandal. In marginal wards, this involved the Council moving the homeless elsewhere, and selling off council homes to groups who were more likely to vote Conservative. On investigation, the policy was ruled to be illegal, and it was revealed that some of the homeless had been rehoused in condemned accommodation. Former leader of the Council Dame Shirley Porter was found guilty of wilful misconduct and ordered to repay £36.1m. In view of her personal circumstances, a payment of £12.3 million was eventually accepted.

Since 2000 the Greater London Authority has taken some responsibility for highways and planning control from the council, but within the English local government system the council remains a "most purpose" authority in terms of the available range of powers and functions.

Powers and functions
The local authority derives its powers and functions from the London Government Act 1963 and subsequent legislation, and has the powers and functions of a London borough council. It sets council tax and as a billing authority also collects precepts for Greater London Authority functions and business rates. It sets planning policies which complement Greater London Authority and national policies, and decides on almost all planning applications accordingly.  It is a local education authority  and is also responsible for council housing, social services, libraries, waste collection and disposal, traffic, and most roads and environmental health.

Buildings
The Council is usually based at Westminster City Hall on Victoria Street in Victoria. The City Hall was designed by Burnet Tait & Partners on a speculative basis, and completed in 1966. Full council meetings are held in the council chamber of Marylebone Town Hall on Marylebone Road, built in 1920 for the former Metropolitan Borough of St Marylebone, one of the council's predecessors.

Summary results of elections

See Westminster City Council elections for former leaders of the council.

Notable councillors 

 Diane Abbott (Labour, Harrow Road 1982–86), MP for Hackney North and Stoke Newington since 1987
 Nickie Aiken (Conservative, Warwick 2006–22), MP for Cities of London and Westminster since 2019
 Edward Argar (Conservative, Warwick ward 2006–15), Member of Parliament for Charnwood since 2015
 Nicholas Boles (Conservative, West End 1998–2002), MP for Grantham and Stamford, 2010–19
 Muriel Bowen (Conservative, Baker Street 1964–68), councillor for Battersea South on London County Council
 Peter Bradley (Labour, Millbank 1986–96), MP for The Wrekin, 1997–2005
 Sir Ashley Bramall (Labour, Alderney 1964–68), MP for Bexley 1946–50 and Leader of the Inner London Education Authority (ILEA) 1970–81; councillor for Bethnal Green on London County Council, 1961–65 and Greater London Council 1965–86 (also Alderman of former Westminster City Council 1959–65)
 John Browne (Conservative, Knightsbridge 1974–78), MP for Winchester, 1979–92
 Karen Buck (Labour, Queen's Park 1990–97), MP for Regent's Park and Kensington North (1997–2010) and Westminster North since 2010
 Melvyn Caplan (Conservative, Little Venice 1990–), leader of the council 1995–2000
 Greg Clark (Conservative, Warwick 2002–05), MP for Tunbridge Wells since 2005
 Neale Coleman (Labour, Maida Vale 1982–90), former senior adviser to Jeremy Corbyn as Leader of the Labour Party
 Robert Davis (Conservative, Bayswater 1982–86; Lancaster Gate 1986–2018), deputy leader of the council, 2008–18 and Lord Mayor (1996)
 Anthony Devenish (Conservative, Knightsbridge and Belgravia 2006–), Member of the London Assembly for West Central since 2016
 Andrew Dismore (Labour, Westbourne 1982–97), MP for Hendon 1997–2010, London Assembly Member for Barnet and Camden 2012–21
 Jonathan Djanogly (Conservative, Regent's Park 1994–2001), MP for Huntingdon since 2001
 Alf Dubs, Baron Dubs (Labour, Westbourne 1971–78), MP for Battersea South (1979–83) and Battersea (1983–87)
 Michael Forsyth, Baron Forsyth of Drumlean (Conservative, Churchill 1978–82; Belgrave 1982–83), MP for Stirling 1983–97
 Trixie Gardner, Baroness Gardner of Parkes (Conservative, Hyde Park 1968–78), first Australian female peer. Councillor on the Greater London Council (GLC), representing Havering 1970–73 and Enfield Southgate 1977–86
 Mair Garside (Labour, Millbank 1996–98), councillor for Woolwich West on London County Council (1958–61); Greenwich (1970–73) and Woolwich East (1973–86) on Greater London Council
 Teresa Gorman (Conservative, Millbank 1982–86), MP for Billericay, 1987–2001
 Illtyd Harrington (Labour, Harrow Road 1964–68, 1971–78; also Harrow Road South 1959–65 on former Paddington Borough Council), deputy leader of the Greater London Council (1981–84) and subsequently GLC chairman (1984–85)
 Michael Latham (Conservative, Churchill 1968–71), MP for Melton, 1974–83; Rutland and Melton 1983–92
 Sir Spencer Le Marchant (Conservative, Warwick 1964–71; Victoria 1956–59, Warwick 1959–65 on former Westminster City Council), MP for High Peak 1970–83
 Barry Legg (Conservative, Regent's Park 1978–91), MP for Milton Keynes South West 1992–97
 Jonathan Lord (Conservative, Little Venice 1994–2002), MP for Woking since 2010
 Serge Lourie (Labour, Westbourne 1971–74), Social Democratic Party–Alliance councillor in Richmond Upon Thames, 1982–90; Liberal Democrat councillor in Richmond Upon Thames, 1990–2010; Leader of the Council (Richmond) 2001–02 and 2006–10
 Kit Malthouse (Conservative, St. George's 1998–2002; Warwick 2002–06), Assembly Member for West Central on the London Assembly; MP for North West Hampshire since 2015 and Secretary of State for Education
 Graham Mather (Conservative, Churchill 1982–86), Member of the European Parliament for Hampshire North and Oxford (1994–99)
 Francis Maude, Baron Maude of Horsham (Conservative, Bayswater 1978–82; Hamilton Terrace 1982–84), MP for North Warwickshire, 1983–92 and Horsham, 1997–2015
 Richard May (Labour, Millbank 1971–78), judge of the International Criminal Tribunal for the Former Yugoslavia 1997–2004; Leader of the Opposition on Westminster Council 1974–77.
 Sir Simon Milton (Conservative, Lancaster Gate 1988–2008; Hon. Alderman 2008–11), Deputy Mayor of London for Policy and Planning (2008–11)
 Robert Moreland (Conservative, Knightsbridge 1990–98), MEP for Staffordshire East 1979–84
 Sir Charles Norton (Conservative, Alderman 1964–71; Grosvenor 1948–62, Alderman 1962–65 on previous Westminster City Council), solicitor
 David Pitt–Watson (Labour, Maida Vale 1986–90), business and social entrepreneur
 Olga Polizzi (Conservative, Lancaster Gate 1989–94), hotelier and interior designer
 Dame Shirley Porter (Conservative, Hyde Park 1974–93), leader of the council 1983–91 and Lord Mayor of Westminster (1991)
 Murad Qureshi (Labour, Church Street 1998–2006), Member of the London Assembly, 2004–16; former chair of Stop the War Coalition
 Glenys Roberts (Conservative, West End 1999–2018), journalist
 Philippa Roe, Baroness Couttie (Conservative, Knightsbridge and Belgravia 2006–18), leader of the council 2012–17
 Lee Rowley (Conservative, Maida Vale 2006–2014), MP for North East Derbyshire since 2017
 Nicholas St Aubyn (Conservative, Little Venice 1982–86), MP for Guildford, 1997–2001
 Michael Shersby (Conservative, Maida Vale 1964–71; also Maida Vale North 1959–65 on former Paddington Borough Council) MP for Uxbridge, 1972–97
 Ben Summerskill (Labour, Westbourne 1994–98), former chief executive of Stonewall
 Manuela Sykes (Labour, Churchill 1971–78), lecturer, writer, and public relations adviser
 David Weeks (Conservative, Warwick 1974–78; St. George's 1978–98), leader of the council 1991–93
 Anne Weyman (Labour, Little Venice 1978–82), vice–chair of Britain for Europe
 Miles Young (Conservative, Victoria 1986–98), businessman

Lord Mayors of Westminster

See also
Homes for votes scandal
Westminster cemeteries scandal
2022 Westminster City Council election
2018 Westminster City Council election

References

 
Local authorities in London
London borough councils
Politics of the City of Westminster
Leader and cabinet executives
Local education authorities in England
Billing authorities in England